The Seychelles wolf snake (Lycognathophis seychellensis) is a species of snake in the superfamily Colubroidea. It is monotypic within the genus Lycognathophis. The New Latin name, Lycognathophis, is derived from the Greek words λύκος (lykos) meaning "wolf", γνάθος (gnathos) meaning "jaw", and όφις (ophis) meaning "snake", referring to the snake's dentition.

Geographic range
It is endemic to Seychelles.

Description
This species has 20-22 large, subequal maxillary teeth and its anterior mandibular teeth are very large, much larger than in the posterior. Its head is very distinct from the neck. The eye is moderate, with a vertically elliptic pupil but no loreal shield. Body elongate; dorsal scales keeled, with apical pits, in 17 rows. Tail long; anal divided; subcaudals paired. Ventrals 184-202; subcaudals 92-110.

Dorsally yellowish or grayish brown, uniform or with dark brown spots; dark streak on each side of head, passing through eye; upper lip yellowish, usually with brown dots; posteriorly four series of brown spots, confluent into stripes on tail. Ventrally yellowish, usually powdered or dotted with brown; a brown spot at each outer end of anterior ventrals.

Adults may attain 1 m (40 inches) in total length, with a tail 31 cm (12 inches) long.

Habitat
Its natural habitats are subtropical or tropical dry forests and subtropical or tropical moist lowland forests.

Conservation status
It is threatened by habitat loss.

References

Colubrids
Fauna of Seychelles
Reptiles described in 1837
Taxonomy articles created by Polbot